Craterostigma is a genus of shrub-like flowering plants in the family Linderniaceae, found in Africa, Madagascar, (island of) Socotra, the Arabian Peninsula, the Indian Subcontinent, Sri Lanka, China, Southeast Asia and Java. The best studied species is the resurrection plant Craterostigma plantagineum, known for its unique drought tolerance.

The word 'craterostigma' comes from two Greek words, krateros meaning cup-shaped and stigma, part of the female reproductive part of a flower.

Species
Currently accepted species include:
Craterostigma abyssinicum (Engl.) Eb.Fisch., Schäferh. & Kai Müll.
Craterostigma alatum Hepper
Craterostigma angolense (Skan) Eb.Fisch., Schäferh. & Kai Müll.
Craterostigma engleri Eb.Fisch., Schäferh. & Kai Müll.
Craterostigma gossweileri (S.Moore) Eb.Fisch., Schäferh. & Kai Müll.
Craterostigma hirsutum S.Moore
Craterostigma kigomense (Eb.Fisch.) Eb.Fisch., Schäferh. & Kai Müll.
Craterostigma lanceolatum (Engl.) Skan
Craterostigma lindernioides E.A.Bruce
Craterostigma loitense I.Darbysh. & Eb.Fisch.
Craterostigma longicarpum Hepper
Craterostigma newtonii (Engl.) Eb.Fisch., Schäferh. & Kai Müll.
Craterostigma niamniamense (Eb.Fisch. & Hepper) Eb.Fisch., Schäferh. & Kai Müll.
Craterostigma nummulariifolium (D.Don) Eb.Fisch., Schäferh. & Kai Müll.
Craterostigma plantagineum Hochst.
Craterostigma pumilum Hochst.
Craterostigma purpureum Lebrun & L.Touss.
Craterostigma pusillum (Engl.) Eb.Fisch., Schäferh. & Kai Müll.
Craterostigma sessiliflorum (Benth.) Y.S.Liang & J.C.Wang
Craterostigma smithii S.Moore
Craterostigma stuhlmannii (Engl.) Eb.Fisch., Schäferh. & Kai Müll.
Craterostigma sudanicum (Eb.Fisch. & Hepper) Eb.Fisch., Schäferh. & Kai Müll.
Craterostigma syncerus (Seine, Eb.Fisch. & Barthlott) Eb.Fisch., Schäferh. & Kai Müll.
Craterostigma tanzanicum Eb.Fisch., Schäferh. & Kai Müll.
Craterostigma wilmsii Engl.
Craterostigma yaundense (S.Moore) Eb.Fisch., Schäferh. & Kai Müll.

References

Other sources
 Fischer, E. et al. 2013. The phylogeny of Linderniaceae - The new genus Linderniella, and new combinations within Bonnaya, Craterostigma, Lindernia, Micranthemum, Torenia and Vandellia. (Willdenowia) 43:221-223.

Linderniaceae
Lamiales genera